Dracula vespertilio is a species of orchid.

vespertilio